Elite Performance Gym is a mixed martial arts training organization founded by former International Fighting Championships (IFC) middleweight and King of the Cage light heavyweight champion, Jeremy Horn.  Elite Performance Gym was founded in Salt Lake City, Utah.

Located in the Sandy area of Salt Lake City, it has an overall area of  split between MMA training equipment, and general fitness and weightlifting equipment.  Beginner, intermediate, and advanced classes are offered in grappling & submission wrestling, boxing, kick boxing & muay Thai, and strength and conditioning. Horn teaches almost all the classes himself.

Notable fighters 
Several fighters have affiliation with Elite Performance Gym, these include:

  Jeremy Horn - (IFL, KOTC, Pancrase, PRIDE, RINGS, UFC, WEC)
  Matt Hughes - (RINGS, UFC)
  Jens Pulver - (WEC, PRIDE, UFC)
  Rich Franklin - (UFC)
  Joe Riggs - (K-1, UFC, WEC, Strikeforce, Bellator)
  Travis Wiuff - (Bellator, UFC, IFL, PRIDE, World Victory Road)
  DaMarques Johnson (UFC)
  Amir Khillah

Elite Fight Night 
Also known as Jeremy Horn's Elite Fight Night, is a roughly once a month MMA showcase located in Sandy, Utah. These monthly events give local MMA fans and spectators the opportunity to witness their hometown fighters competing against other athletes in a professional venue. Local and corporate sponsors alike fund the events, which local sports commissioning bodies oversee to ensure fairness and safety.

References

External links
 ElitePerformanceGym.com Official Elite Performance Gym website
 Elite Fight Night Jeremy Horn's Elite Fight Night website
 Mixed Martial Arts 

Mixed martial arts training facilities
Organizations established in 2006
2006 establishments in Utah